Blue is a 1993 drama film directed by Derek Jarman. It is his final feature film, released four months before his death from AIDS-related complications. Such complications had already rendered him partially blind at the time of the film's release, only being able to see in shades of blue.

The film was his last testament as a film-maker, and consists of a single shot of saturated blue colour - specifically International Klein Blue (RGB 0, 47, 167, CMYK 100, 72, 0, 35). This fills the screen, as background to a soundtrack where Jarman's and some of his long-time collaborators' narration describes his life and vision.

Structure
The film is split into two halves, with differing strands of narration. The first story, intercut with the second, tells the adventures of Blue, as a character and color. Blue is described as getting into fights with other colors, "Yellowbelly scorches the earth with its accursed breath...", to adventures, "Marco Polio stumbles across the blue mountains...".

The other story features the day-to-day life of Derek Jarman, as a gay man living in 1990s London, and the complications of living with AIDS. Some of the events mentioned are realistic and true, such as visiting a café with friends, discussing the war in Sarajevo, and having difficulty with day-to-day life, such as putting clothes on backwards. Others feel more dreamlike, such as when Jarman wonders what is beyond the sky. This contrasts with thoughts of his health and how long he has left until he dies, the weakening of his body, and eventual downfall of his eyesight.

There are also a handful of sections in which Jarman daydreams. The narration makes mention of walking across the sky, and to wondering what an astronaut may be like.

The film's final moments consist of a set of names, being repeated. "John. Daniel. Howard. Graham. Terry. Paul". These names are all former lovers and friends of Jarman who had died of AIDS.

Jarman himself would succumb to AIDS on 19 February 1994 at the age of 52, just months after the film's premiere.

Cast
All narrators:

 John Quentin
 Nigel Terry
 Derek Jarman
 Tilda Swinton

Release and premiere
On its premiere, on 19 September 1993, Channel 4 and BBC Radio 3 collaborated on a simultaneous broadcast so viewers could enjoy a stereo soundtrack. Radio 3 subsequently broadcast the soundtrack separately as a radio play and it was later released as a CD.

The film has been released on DVD in Germany and in Italy. On 23 July 2007 British distributor 'Artificial Eye' released DVD tying Blue together with Glitterbug, a collage of Jarman's Super 8 footage.

Cinematographer Christopher Doyle has called Blue one of his favourite films, calling it "one of the most intimate films I've ever seen."

See also
 List of avant-garde films of the 1990s

References

External links 

 

1993 films
1993 drama films
Gay-related films
British LGBT-related films
1993 LGBT-related films
British avant-garde and experimental films
1990s avant-garde and experimental films
LGBT-related drama films
HIV/AIDS in British films
Non-narrative films
Films about blind people
Film4 Productions films
Films directed by Derek Jarman
1990s English-language films
1990s British films